Fritz Malholmes Furtick (July 15, 1882 – May 5, 1962) was an American football halfback for the Clemson Tigers of Clemson University. He was twice selected All-Southern, and was captain of the undefeated 1906 team.

Early years
Fritz was born on July 15, 1882 in Sandy Run, South Carolina to Wade Hampton Furtick and Narcissa Ellen Saylor.

College football
Furtick made Clemson's second score in the 1903 game with Cumberland billed as the championship of the South which ended in an 11–11 tie. It was also John Heisman's last game coached at Clemson. Cumberland had expected a trick play, when Furtick simply ran up the middle he scored. The referee of the Tennessee clash which ended in a tie, Frank Watkins, said "Furtick was as good bucking halfback as he had ever seen." "In the opening game with V. P. I. of 1906 that ended in a scoreless tie, Furtick played what the Atlanta Constitution called "the game of his life" on both sides of the ball.

References

External links 

1882 births
1962 deaths
Players of American football from South Carolina
Clemson Tigers football players
American football halfbacks
All-Southern college football players
People from Calhoun County, South Carolina